Suvankar Bal (born 3 November 1995) is an Indian cricketer. He made his Twenty20 debut on 10 January 2021, for Bengal in the 2020–21 Syed Mushtaq Ali Trophy. He made his List A debut on 27 February 2021, for Bengal in the 2020–21 Vijay Hazare Trophy.

References

External links
 

1995 births
Living people
Indian cricketers
Bengal cricketers
Place of birth missing (living people)